Alfred Jordan "A. J." Mandani (born February 27, 1987) is a Filipino-Canadian basketball player for the CLS Knights Indonesia of the Indonesian Basketball League. He was selected 14th overall in the 2012 PBA draft by the GlobalPort Batang Pier.

Mandani was traded to the Bolts in 2013 alongside Gary David for Chris Ross, Chris Timberlake and two second round draft picks.

PBA career statistics

Correct as of October 30, 2013

Season

|-
|-
| align="left" | 2012–13
| align="left" | GlobalPort
| 29 || 15.5 || .492 || .211 || .676 || 2.1 || 1.8 || .3 || .0 || 5.1
|-
| align="left" | Career
| align="left" |
| 29 || 15.5 || .492 || .211 || .676 || 2.1 || 1.8 || .3 || .0 || 5.1

References

1987 births
Living people
Basketball people from Ontario
Canadian expatriate basketball people in the United States
Canadian expatriate sportspeople in Singapore
Canadian expatriate sportspeople in Thailand
Canadian men's basketball players
Canadian sportspeople of Filipino descent
College men's basketball players in the United States
Terrafirma Dyip players
Filipino expatriate basketball people in Singapore
Filipino expatriate basketball people in Thailand
Filipino men's basketball players
Junior college men's basketball players in the United States
Maharlika Pilipinas Basketball League players
Meralco Bolts players
Missouri University of Science and Technology alumni
NorthPort Batang Pier draft picks
NorthPort Batang Pier players
Point guards
Shooting guards
Singapore Slingers players
Sportspeople from Mississauga
Citizens of the Philippines through descent